The Muddlers Club is a restaurant in Belfast, Northern Ireland. It was awarded a Michelin star in the 2020 Michelin Guide Great Britain & Ireland.

Chef patron Gareth McCaughey (formerly of Ox) founded The Muddlers Club in 2015, naming it after a revolutionary secret society linked to the United Irishmen that met in the area in the 1790s. It is located in the Cathedral Quarter.

Awards
 Michelin star: since 2020

See also
List of Michelin starred restaurants in Ireland

References

External links
Official Site

Culture in Belfast
Michelin Guide starred restaurants in Ireland
2015 establishments in Northern Ireland